In Islam, al-A'raf is a separator realm or borderland between Jannah (heaven) and Jahannam (hell), inhabited by those who are evenly balanced in their sins and virtues, they are not entirely evil nor are they entirely good. This place may be described as a kind of benevolent purgatory with privation but without suffering.

The word is literally translated as "the heights" in English. The realm is described as a high curtain between hell and paradise. Ibn Kathir described A'raf as a wall that contains a gate. In this high wall lived people who witness the terror of hell and the beauty of paradise. They yearn to enter paradise, but their sins and virtues are evenly balanced. Yet with the mercy of God, they will be among the last people to enter the paradise. The Catholic scholar of Islam Louis Massignon believed the Christian concept of limbo was inspired by the Muslim interpretation of A'raf.

A'raf is described in the Quran in sura Al-A'raf, 46–47.

See also
Purgatory
Gehenna
Barzakh
Matarta in Mandaeism

References

Islamic eschatology
Islamic cosmology
Islamic terminology
Limbo
Afterlife places